Brecknock Township is the name of some places in the U.S. state of Pennsylvania:
Brecknock Township, Berks County, Pennsylvania
Brecknock Township, Lancaster County, Pennsylvania

Pennsylvania township disambiguation pages